Mill Creek Wind Farm is a wind farm in the Ohariu Valley near Wellington, New Zealand.

The wind farm is operated by Meridian Energy and has 26 wind turbines. 
  
The application for resource consents described the project as having a total capacity of up to 71.3MW. A 33,000-volt power line connects the wind farm to Transpower's Wilton substation, where the farm's electricity is injected into both Wellington Electricity's local distribution network and the national grid.

Local Ohariu Valley residents who opposed the development lodged an appeal to the Environment Court. In August 2011, the Environment  Court approved the resource consents for the project, subject to a limit of 26 turbines.

Construction began in late 2012, and the first electricity was generated in May 2014. It became fully operational in October 2014.

See also

Wind power in New Zealand

References

External links
Meridian Energy website

Wellington City
Wind farms in New Zealand